Jayme Alaric de Perpignan was an ambassador sent by Pope Clement IV and James I of Aragon to the Mongol ruler Abaqa Khan in 1267.

The Byzantine Emperor Michael VIII Palaiologos had sent his illegitimate daughter Maria Palaiologina to be the bride of Hulagu Khan, Abaqa's predecessor.  Hulagu died before she arrived, and she was thus wed instead to Abaqa.  She became a popular religious figure to the Mongols, who had previously looked to Doquz Khatun, Hulagu's wife, as a religious leader.  After the death of Doquz, this sentiment turned to Maria, who was called "Despina Khatun".

Clement and James had been encouraged by this, towards the possibility that the Mongols might join the Europeans in a Franco-Mongol alliance against the Muslims.  From Viterbo in 1267, they sent a letter, carried by Jayme Alaric de Perpignan. It was responding positively to previous messages from the Mongols, and informed Abaqa of the upcoming Crusade (the Eighth Crusade).

However, Abaqa was distracted by wars with other sections of the Mongol Empire, and would only make vague promises of assistance.

Jayme Alaric would return to Europe in 1269, accompanied by a Mongol embassy.

See also
 Franco-Mongol alliance

Notes

References
"Histoire des Croisades III", Rene Grousset
"A history of the Crusades III", Steven Runciman

13th-century births
Ambassadors to the Mongol Empire
Christians of the Crusades
Year of death unknown
13th-century diplomats